Athens   is a city in Menard County, Illinois, United States. The population was 1,977 at the 2020 census. It is part of the Springfield, Illinois Metropolitan Statistical Area.

Geography
Illinois Routes 29 and 123 pass together through the northeast side of the city. IL 29 leads south  to Springfield, the state capital, and north  to Mason City, while IL 123 leads east  to Williamsville and northwest to Petersburg.

Town Branch flows westward across the southwest corner of the city, leading  to the Sangamon River, part of the Illinois River watershed.

Demographics

At the 2000 census there were 1,726 people in 695 households, including 462 families, in the city. The racial makeup of the city was 98.26% White, 0.41% African American, 0.12% Native American, 0.23% Asian, 0.46% from other races, and 0.52% from two or more races. Hispanic or Latino of any race were 1.27%.

Of the 695 households 37.0% had children under the age of 18 living with them, 52.1% were married couples living together, 11.9% had a female householder with no husband present, and 33.5% were non-families. 28.5% of households were one person and 11.7% were one person aged 65 or older. The average household size was 2.48 and the average family size was 3.10.

The age distribution was 28.6% under the age of 18, 8.0% from 18 to 24, 31.3% from 25 to 44, 21.8% from 45 to 64, and 10.3% 65 or older. The median age was 35 years. For every 100 females, there were 84.8 males. For every 100 females age 18 and over, there were 86.7 males.

The median household income was $41,208 and the median family income  was $50,272. Males had a median income of $32,375 versus $24,519 for females. The per capita income for the city was $17,981. About 5.4% of families and 6.9% of the population were below the poverty line, including 8.9% of those under age 18 and 13.5% of those age 65 or over.

Recreation
The trail includes a bridge over the Sangamon River and Cantrall Creek.

Notable people

 Jack Brittin, pitcher for the Philadelphia Phillies
 Alice Sudduth Byerly (1855–1904), temperance activist
 H. V. Porter, educator, coach, and member of the Naismith Memorial Basketball Hall of Fame; principal of Athens High School from 1919 to 1927

See also

 List of municipalities in Illinois

References

External links

 

Cities in Illinois
Cities in Menard County, Illinois
Springfield metropolitan area, Illinois